Thomas Christopher Parnell (born February 5, 1967) is an American actor and comedian. First breaking through as a performer with the Los Angeles comedy troupe The Groundlings, Parnell found wider success during his tenure as a cast member on the NBC sketch comedy series Saturday Night Live from 1998 to 2006. After leaving SNL, he played the role of Dr. Leo Spaceman on NBC's sitcom 30 Rock from 2006 to 2013. In animation, he voices Cyril Figgis on the FX series Archer, Jerry Smith on Adult Swim's Rick and Morty, Doug on FOX's Family Guy, and the narrator on the PBS Kids series WordGirl (2007-2015). He also voices "The Progressive Box" in a series of advertisements by the Progressive Corporation.

Early life
Parnell was born in Memphis, Tennessee, to a Southern Baptist family. His father, Jack Parnell, was a radio personality in Memphis. He attended the Southern Baptist Educational Center, and graduated from Germantown High School. He decided to pursue acting as a career at age 17 and set his sights on being a theater actor. He attended the University of North Carolina School of the Arts where he received his BFA in Drama. He moved to Houston, Texas after college to do an apprentice actor program for a season at the Alley Theatre, but did not get asked back to join the company. He became temporarily disenchanted with acting, and returned to his hometown and taught high school for a year. He moved to Los Angeles and auditioned for the Groundlings in 1992.

Career
While performing as a company player with the Groundlings for a number of years, Parnell began doing commercials and getting guest roles on various sitcoms, such as Seinfeld and Murphy Brown. He was hired to join the cast of Saturday Night Live as a featured player, and debuted on the show on September 26, 1998. He was promoted to repertory player the following season. In the summer of 2001, because of budget cuts and the hiring of four new cast members, Lorne Michaels was required to dismiss two cast members; he chose to lay off Parnell and Jerry Minor over Horatio Sanz, Rachel Dratch, and Maya Rudolph. Parnell was rehired in the middle of the following season.

While on SNL, Parnell appeared in numerous sketches and commercial parodies, and performed impressions of various celebrities. Among his notable sketches are "Lazy Sunday", a rap video he shot with Andy Samberg, and "More Cowbell". He has performed raps about hosts Jennifer Garner, Britney Spears, Kirsten Dunst, and Ashton Kutcher. On the DVD commentary for the West Coast version of the 30 Rock episode "Live Show", Tina Fey and Beth McCarthy Miller noted that Parnell was nicknamed "The Ice Man" while working at SNL, because of his apparent immunity to breaking character, citing the "More Cowbell" sketch in which he was the only actor not to break.

In 2006, Michaels laid off Parnell, as well as Horatio Sanz and Finesse Mitchell, due to budget cuts. This effectively made Parnell the only SNL performer to have been released twice by Michaels, although Parnell said in a 2008 interview with The Sound Of Young America that he was okay with being let go this time, as he was considering leaving after that season anyway, adding that he probably would have stayed one more season had he been asked back. He had been with SNL for eight seasons; at the time only four people (Darrell Hammond, Tim Meadows, Kevin Nealon, and Al Franken) had been cast members longer. He has since made uncredited cameo appearances on the show, including parodying newscasters Tom Brokaw, Jim Lehrer, and Bob Schieffer. Parnell and his former SNL castmate Horatio Sanz starred together in Big Lake, a 2010 sitcom on Comedy Central from executive producers Will Ferrell and Adam McKay.

Parnell voiced Fly in the animated films Hotel Transylvania and Hotel Transylvania 2, and Stan the Fishman in Hotel Transylvania 3: Summer Vacation. He is a series regular on the FX animated series Archer, and is also known for his guest appearances as Dr. Leo Spaceman on 30 Rock. He provides the voice of the narrator on the PBS children's series WordGirl. From 2011 to 2014, Parnell co-starred on the ABC comedy series Suburgatory where he played the husband of the character played by his former SNL castmate Ana Gasteyer. His role started out as recurring in the first season but he was bumped up to a series regular in the second season. The series aired for three seasons on ABC. 

Parnell provides the voice of the "Progressive Box" in commercials for Progressive Insurance. Since 2013, Parnell has voiced Jerry Smith (and his alternate reality variants) on the Adult Swim series Rick and Morty. On March 16, 2018, Parnell was cast in the main role of Wayne on the CBS sitcom Happy Together.

Filmography

Film

Television

Video games

Music videos

Audio

References

External links

1967 births
20th-century American comedians
21st-century American comedians
20th-century American male actors
21st-century American male actors
Living people
American impressionists (entertainers)
American male comedians
American male film actors
American sketch comedians
American male stage actors
American male television actors
American male voice actors
Male actors from Memphis, Tennessee
Male actors from Tennessee
People from Germantown, Tennessee
University of North Carolina School of the Arts alumni